Premi Gangaram is a 1978 Bollywood romance film directed by Jagdish Nirula.

Plot 
The love between Gangaram, a talented singer and Jamuna, is a universally known affair. In order to break this love, Jamuna's father takes his daughter away to an unspecified place. Gangaram with the help of Leela, his adopted sister, plays a ruse and they swap places before Jamuna is to take the rounds around the sacred fire with Leela's boy friend to see that the respective spouses are united with their lovers.

Cast

 Ashok Kumar
 Yogita Bali as Yamna
 Anwar Hussain as 
 I. S. Johar as Ganga
 Bindu
 Tun Tun as Dano
 Birbal as Pandet
 Kartar Singh as Sikh Post man
 Jankidas as Jankidas 
 Randhir (actor) as Satish father 
 Dolly
 Jugnu
 Kirti Bahi
 Kuldip Kaur
 Laila
 Mehar Mittal
 Moolchand as Ganga Ram father
 Paul Sharma as Rai Bahdur
 Saigal
 Satish Kaul as Satish
 Seema Kapoor
 Shama
 Uttam Sodi
 Vimi as Lela teacher 
 Yasmin

Soundtrack 
Music composed by Sonik Omi and lyrics were written by Verma Malik.

References

External links
 

1978 films
1970s Hindi-language films
1970s romance films
Indian romance films
Hindi-language romance films